Maistre is a surname.

It may refer to:

Persons

 Joseph de Maistre (1753 – 1821), French-language Savoyard political philosopher and diplomat
 Casimir Maistre (1867-1957), French geographer
 François Maistre (1925-2016), French actor
 François-Xavier Maistre (1705-1789), Savoyard politician, father of Joseph and Xavier, from Aspremont, Alpes-Maritimes, France
 John A. Gauci-Maistre K.M. (born 1947), Maltese businessman
 Paul Maistre (1858-1922), French general who fought in WWI
 Richard Master aka Richard Maistres (died 1588), English physician to Queen Elizabeth I

Fictional characters
 Dean Maistre, a character from Karakuri Circus, see List of Karakuri Circus characters

See also

 
 Mastre (disambiguation)
 Maitre (surname)
 Le Maistre (surname)
 De Maistre (surname)